The Zwethau Formation is a geologic formation in Germany. It preserves fossils dating back to the Cambrian period.

Fossil content 
The following fossils have been reported from the formation:

 Afiacyathus paracompositus
 Coscinocyathus germanicus
 Dictyocyathus stipatus
 Erismacoscinus tainius
 Erismacoscinus aff. primus
 Protopharetra dissuta
 P. gemmata
 Proaulopora cf. glabra
 Afiacyathus sp.
 Botomaella sp.
 Coscinocyathus sp.
 Epiphyton sp.
 Erismacoscinus sp.
 Kordephyton sp.
 Renalcis sp.
 Diplostraca indet.
 Hyolitha indet.
 Trilobita indet.

See also 
 List of fossiliferous stratigraphic units in Germany

References

Bibliography 
 

Geologic formations of Germany
Cambrian System of Europe
Cambrian Germany
Cambrian Series 2
Limestone formations
Reef deposits
Cambrian southern paleotemperate deposits
Paleontology in Germany
Formations